Wabash is a ghost town in Mineral County, in the U.S. state of West Virginia.

History
A post office called Wabash was established in 1904, and remained in operation until 1913. The community took its name from the Wabash Railroad.

References

Ghost towns in West Virginia
Geography of Mineral County, West Virginia